Asteroid is a 1997 NBC TV miniseries about the United States government trying to prevent an asteroid from colliding with the Earth.  The miniseries aired February 16–17, 1997.

Plot
Late one night, near Billings, Montana, a gas tanker is driving by when a meteoroid suddenly hits in front of the truck. The driver attempts to swerve out of the way, but loses control and overturns and the tanker explodes, causing a massive fire.

The next morning, the fire is burning out of control and it is reported that the tanker was hit by a lightning bolt. With the area evacuated, FEMA Director Jack Wallach (Michael Biehn), and a colleague, Adam Marquez (Carlos Gómez) are flying via helicopter over the area, inspecting the fire, when they notice that two people are still in the area. It's a man on the roof of his house, trying to save it, despite his wife's protests.  Jack and Adam land and take the woman aboard. Her husband starts to suffer from smoke inhalation when Jack manages to get him aboard the helicopter. Jack just barely manages to escape as a propane tank causes a massive explosion and destroys the home.

Later that evening, at the National Observatory in Boulder, Colorado, Dr. Lily McKee (Annabella Sciorra), the Observatory's director, is observing a comet which is going to pass by Earth on the 4th of July. Later on, when she goes home and looks at some photos, she sees what she believes are asteroids.

The next day, she informs Jack and Adam of the possibility of an impact and calls them in. She tells them of two asteroids: Helios and Eros, whose orbits have been disrupted by the comet and may hit the Earth. Helios would hit with the force of 1,000 Hiroshima bombs and generate temperatures five times hotter than the Sun in the area of impact. Everything within a 150-mile radius would be destroyed and the impact would also spray molten rock another 70 miles.

Eros is four miles across and would cause a global ecological disaster if it did indeed hit. Then, Max Jenson (Brian Hill), one of Lily's assistants, informs Lily, Jack and Adam that Helios is getting closer to the Earth and that the observatory in Mauna Kea, Hawaii had picked up some smaller asteroids that the National Observatory cannot see and they believe that a small one hit Montana. Jack and Adam realize that the fire was indeed caused by an asteroid impact. Lily and Max check Helios' trajectory and realize that it will indeed hit the Earth.

Their numbers show that Helios will hit the Kansas City area within 48 hours. They inform the President and he orders that the city be evacuated.  Ultimately, a fragment of Helios strikes a dam in the Kansas City area, causing flooding in the city.  Wallach, who drives into the city to rescue two stranded firefighters and a drunk driver who struck their vehicle, gets caught in the flood.  He and the firefighters survive, but the drunk driver dies. Wallach is then informed by McKee that Eros is, in fact, going to impact Earth.

The United States military attempts to destroy Eros using special lasers mounted on three jet fighter aircraft, but one of the lasers is damaged when the jet carrying it takes off through a hurricane. After making some last-minute adjustments, the lasers on the other two aircraft are used to seemingly destroy Eros. It is discovered that the mission was only partially successful. Instead of destroying the asteroid, the lasers broke it into many small yet deadly pieces.

The largest piece and several smaller fragments of Eros hit Dallas, Texas, where Lily's son and father are.  The city is devastated by the impacts. Lily desperately searches the city for her father and son, who survive the blast and aftershocks.  Her father ends up trapped and hurt in the ruins of the hospital where he worked, while her son Elliot wanders off trying to find help. Meanwhile, Adam is shot and killed by a refugee while addressing an evacuation camp. After a search, Lily locates her father and with the help of nearby firemen, rescues him, but goes on to try to rescue Elliot. After searching the ruined city, she finally locates Elliot in a large impact crater. Jack arrives to help in a helicopter and rescues Elliot. The four return to base where they watch the comet pass by Earth, and are relieved it won't return to cause trouble for another 4,000 years.

Cast

Production 
The idea for Asteroid originated in 1994, after NBC movies chief Lindy DeKoven saw news reports on the Shoemaker-Levi 9 Jupiter impact.  Working with producer John Davis, they developed a story framed as an action-adventure drama.  The promotional budget was $2 million, with a production budget of $19 million.  Principal photography took 60 days, filming in Los Angeles and Denver.  A further 60 days were devoted to post-production.  The visual effects company, Stargate Films, used 40,000 gallons of liquid propane for fire, 2,000 gallons of liquid nitrogen for steam, and 500 black powder bombs.  NBC Entertainment president Warren Littlefield described the production as, “A huge rock, exploding buildings, people fleeing…what’s not to love?”  According to Michael Biehn, it was a dangerous production.  Some crew injuries were caused by a falling crane and a premature special effects explosion.

Entertainment Weekly included three detailed descriptions of the film's notable effects sequences:

 "The pre-pulverized version of a Dallas business district, a 30-foot- by 50-foot model, required eight weeks to construct. Lined with small explosives, the set was built on a carpet suspended above a rolling contraption designed to simulate ground-rippling shock waves from an asteroid smash. (By the way, the prop asteroids, which weighed anywhere from 50 to 700 pounds, were made from lava and prettied up with pumice, glitter, and iridescent paints.) This sequence had to be shot twice because the roller hit a snag during the first run, “destroying” only half the model. It took another week to refurbish it for a reshoot.”
 "The giant crater and fire-baked Dallas required a second intricate model that also took eight weeks to build. Made of wood, steel mesh, and fotex (a flameproof plaster), it’s wired to leak smoky liquid nitrogen. Shooting lasted for two weeks inside the crater, though this wasn’t live action; actors were filmed in front of green screens and later edited into about 80 shots."
 "To create the dam busting and flooding of a street in Kansas City, the crew crafted a 12-foot-high, 15-foot-wide wall made of pyrocil, a featherweight substance that “looks like cement but breaks like eggshells.”  Once the dam was detonated, 10 mortars blasted hundreds of gallons of water at speeds up to 150 mph.  The force of the water flow—40,000 gallons in 15 seconds—washed away three cameramen during a take; they resurfaced, but two cameras totaling $80,000 were ruined."

Reception 
Ray Richmond of Variety wrote, “More aptly titled “Aster-Oy!” the four hours sends the plausibility meter clear off the scale. And while special-effects supervisors Sam Nicholson and Dan Schmit do some nifty pyrotechnics and destruction of scale miniatures, the storyline is so utterly predictable and banal that you find yourself rooting for the fiery rocks to do their stuff quickly so we can get on with our lives.”

Tom Jicha wrote for the South Florida Sun-Sentinel, “The spectacular special effects are the show and they are great fun. You could watch Asteroid with the sound off and, except for the explosions, enjoy it almost as much. Besides, unless you haven't been watching TV over the past few weeks, you've seen promos with asteroids leveling cities.  The most sensational pyrotechnics are in Part One. There are several minutes of explosions at the outset of Part Two to get viewers rehooked, but then Asteroid bogs down into a tedious search and rescue mission.”

Awards 
Asteroid won a Primetime Emmy Award for Outstanding Special Visual Effects.

Notes

External links

1997 television films
1997 films
1990s disaster films
American disaster films
Disaster television films
1990s English-language films
433 Eros
Films set in Missouri
Films about impact events
NBC network original films
Fiction about near-Earth asteroids
Films directed by Bradford May
1990s American films